The 1918 South Dakota gubernatorial election was held on November 5, 1918. Incumbent Republican Governor Peter Norbeck ran for re-election to a second term. He won the Republican primary unopposed and faced Nonpartisan League candidate Mark P. Bates, a farmer, and Democratic nominee James E. Bird in the general election. Norbeck's share of the vote decreased from 1916 to 53%, but he benefited from the split field. Bates placed second with 26% of the vote, while Bird placed third with 19% of the vote.

Primary elections
Primary elections were held on May 28, 1918.

Democratic primary

Candidates
James E. Bird, businessman, 1916 Democratic nominee for Secretary of State

Results

Republican primary

Candidates
Peter Norbeck, incumbent Governor

Results

Socialist primary

Candidates
Orville Anderson, farmer and prisoner

Results

General election

Candidates
James E. Bird, Democratic
Peter Norbeck, Republican
Orville Anderson, Socialist
Mark P. Bates, Independent (Nonpartisan League candidate), stockman
Knute Lewis, Independent, Prohibition candidate for Governor in 1898 and 1906

Results

References

Bibliography
 

1918
South Dakota
Gubernatorial
November 1918 events